Down is used in the name of geographical features or locations that are downland or close to downland, including:

Abbotts Ann Down, hamlet in Hampshire, England
Afton Down, chalk down near the village of Freshwater on the Isle of Wight
Andover Down, hamlet in Hampshire, England
Arreton Down, biological Site of Special Scientific Interest on the Isle of Wight
Ashley Down, area in the north of Bristol
Aston Down, east of Minchinhampton, Gloucestershire, England
Asylum Down, neighborhood in Accra, Ghana
Ballard Down, area of chalk downland on the Purbeck Hills in Dorset, England
Batcombe Down, biological Site of Special Scientific Interest in Dorset, England
Bathampton Down, overlooking Bath, Somerset, England
Beaminster Down, one of the highest hills in West Dorset, England
Bembridge Down, Site of special scientific interest north-east of Sandown, Isle of Wight
Bin Down, hill, 203 metres (666 ft) high near Liskeard in the county of Cornwall, England
Black Down, Dorset, hill on the South Dorset Ridgeway in Dorset, England
Black Down, Somerset, the highest hill in the Mendip Hills, Somerset, England
Black Down, Sussex, the highest hill in the county of Sussex, England
Black Hill Down, biological Site of Special Scientific Interest in Dorset, England
Blow's Down, biological Site of Special Scientific Interest in Dunstable, Bedfordshire, England
Bolberry Down, clifftop area on the coast of Devon, England
MoD Boscombe Down, aircraft testing site in Amesbury, Wiltshire, England
Botley Down, biological Site of Special Scientific Interest in Wiltshire, England
Bourton Down, biological Site of Special Scientific Interest in Gloucestershire, England
Brading Down, chalk down southwest of Brading, Isle of Wight
Brean Down, promontory off the coast of Somerset, England
Brickworth Down and Dean Hill, biological Site of Special Scientific Interest in Wiltshire, England
Brighstone Down, chalk down on the Isle of Wight
Broadhalfpenny Down, historic cricket ground in Hambledon, Hampshire
Burcombe Down, area of chalk grassland south of Burcombe in Wiltshire, England
Burham Down, woodland reserve in Kent
Calbourne Down in Calbourne, a village and civil parish on the Isle of Wight
Camp Down, biological Site of Special Scientific Interest in Wiltshire, England
Camp Down, Portsdown Hill, Admiralty semaphore station, near Portsmouth, England
Castle Down, windswept plateau of maritime heath in the island of Tresco, Isles of Scilly
Catherington Down, Hampshire, England
Chaldon Down, one of the highest hills on South Dorset's Jurassic Coast in England
Charlton Down, village in Dorset, England
Charnage Down Chalk Pit, geological Site of Special Scientific Interest in Wiltshire, England
Chavey Down, hamlet in Berkshire, England
Cherhill Down, village and civil parish in Wiltshire, England
Chilbolton Down, hamlet in the civil parish of Chilbolton, Hampshire, England
Claverton Down, suburb on the south-east hilltop edge of Bath, Somerset, England
Clearbury Down, biological Site of Special Scientific Interest in Wiltshire, England
Clifton Down, public open space in Bristol, England, north of the village of Clifton
Cockey Down, biological Site of Special Scientific Interest in Wiltshire, England
Combe Down, village suburb of Bath, Somerset, England
Combe Down and Bathampton Down Mines, Site of Special Scientific Interest in Bath, Somerset, England
Compton Down, hill on the Isle of Wight just to the east of Freshwater Bay
Copehill Down, UK Ministry of Defence training facility on Salisbury Plain, Wiltshire, England
County Down, county in Northern Ireland
Crawley Down, village in the Mid Sussex district of West Sussex, England
Culver Down, chalk down to the north of Sandown, Isle of Wight
Danks Down and Truckle Hill, biological Site of Special Scientific Interest in Wiltshire, England
Dorset Down, breed of sheep native to the Dorset Downs region of England
Downe, a village in Greater London, England; formerly known as Down
Duncan Down, open, public, area to the south west of Whitstable, England
Dundry Down, village south of Bristol, England
Durdham Down, area of public open space in Bristol, England
East Down, Devon, village and civil parish in the Barnstaple district of Devon, England
Ebsbury Down, biological Site of Special Scientific Interest in Wiltshire, England
Emery Down, small village in the New Forest National Park in Hampshire, England
Epsom Down, used as a cricket venue between 1816 and 1819, near Epsom, England
Farthing Down, open space in Coulsdon in the London Borough of Croydon, England
Finkley Down, suburb and hamlet in the civil parish of Finkley in Hampshire, England
Five Ash Down, small village within the civil parish of Maresfield, East Sussex, England
Fyfield Down, part of the Marlborough Downs, north of the village of Fyfield, Wiltshire, England
Galley Down Wood, biological Site of Special Scientific Interest in Hampshire, England
Garston's Down, Site of special scientific interest which is south of Carisbrooke, Isle of Wight
Gurston Down Motorsport Hillclimb, in Broad Chalke, Wiltshire, England
Hadlow Down, village and civil parish in the Wealden District of East Sussex, England
Head Down, Hampshire, one of the highest points in the county of Hampshire, England
Headley Down, village within the civil parish of Headley, Hampshire, England
Henwood Down, one of the highest points in the county of Hampshire, England
High Down (Isle of Wight), area of downland on Isle of Wight, England
Hingston Down, hill not far from Gunnislake in Cornwall, England, United Kingdom
Holybourne Down, high point near Alton, Hampshire, England
Houghton Down, hamlet in the Test Valley district of Hampshire, England
Itchin Stoke Down, rural location near the town of Alresford in Hampshire, England
Kentisbury Down, location of an Iron Age enclosurenear Blackmore Gate, Exmoor, Devon, England
Kimpton Down, village and civil parish in the Test Valley district of Hampshire, England
Lady Down Quarry, geological Site of Special Scientific Interest in Wiltshire, England
Lardon Chase, the Holies and Lough Down, adjacent National Trust properties in Berkshire, England
Maes Down, geological Site of Special Scientific Interest between Shepton Mallet and Stoney Stratton in Somerset, England
Melbury Down, area of downland in northern Dorset, England
Milber Down, Iron Age hill fort on the hill above the suburb of Milber, Newton Abbot, Devon, England
Mockham Down, the site of an Iron Age Hill Fort close to Brayfordhill in Devon, England
Mottistone Down, Site of Special Scientific Interest north of Mottistone, Isle of Wight
Nine Barrow Down, elongated hill, the northern ridge of the Purbeck Hills in Dorset, England
Normanton Down Barrows, Neolithic and Bronze Age barrow cemetery south of Stonehenge in Wiltshire, England
Northington Down, hamlet in the civil parish of Northington, Hampshire, England
Odd Down, area of the city of Bath, Somerset, England
Odstock Down, biological Site of Special Scientific Interest in Wiltshire, England
Old Castle Down, Site of Special Scientific Interest in the Vale of Glamorgan, South Wales
Old Down, hamlet near Olveston and Tockington in South Gloucestershire, England
Otterham Down, village and a civil parish in north Cornwall, England
Overton Down, a long-term project in experimental archaeology in Wiltshire, England
Park Gate Down, stretch of chalk downland near Elham in East Kent, England
Parsonage Down, biological Site of Special Scientific Interest in Wiltshire, England
Payne's Down, prominent hill near Axminster, Dorset, England
Perham Down, village in Wiltshire, England, near Ludgershall and Tidworth
Perriam Down near Ludgershall, Wiltshire, England was used as a cricket venue between 1787 and 1796
Pincombe Down, biological Site of Special Scientific Interest in Wiltshire, England
Pitcombe Down, biological Site of Special Scientific Interest in Dorset, England
Porth Hellick Down, area of downland on the island of St Mary's in the Isles of Scilly
Porton Down, United Kingdom government military science park
Prescombe Down, biological Site of Special Scientific Interest in Wiltshire, England
Rampisham Down, chalk hill in the Dorset Downs, near Dorchester, Dorset, England
Rew Down, Site of Special Scientific Interest and Local Nature Reserve, Isle of Wight
Roundway Down and Covert, biological Site of Special Scientific Interest in Wiltshire, England
Seaton Down, the location of an Iron Age hill fort near Seaton, Devon, England
Shovel Down, area of Dartmoor in Devon, England that is covered in megaliths
Southern Down or Southerndown, village in South Wales to the southwest of Bridgend
St. Catherine's Down, chalk down on the Isle of Wight, near the southernmost point on the island
St Boniface Down, chalk down on the Isle of Wight, England
Starveall and Stony Down, Site of Special Scientific Interest in Codford and Wylye, Wiltshire, England
Steeple Langford Down, biological Site of Special Scientific Interest at Steeple Langford in Wiltshire, England
Stenbury Down, chalk down on the Isle of Wight
Stockton Wood and Down, biological Site of Special Scientific Interest in Wiltshire, England
Stonehill Down Nature Reserve, downland nature reserve on the Purbeck Hills, Dorset, England
Stoney Down, hill and forested countryside in Dorset, England
Stormy Down, Site of Special Scientific Interest near Pyle in Bridgend County Borough, south Wales
Stratford Toney Down, biological Site of Special Scientific Interest in Wiltshire, England
Tennyson Down, hill at the west end of the Isle of Wight just south of Totland
Throope Down, biological Site of Special Scientific Interest in Wiltshire, England
Thruxton Down, west of Andover, Hampshire, England
Toller Down, one of the highest hills in the county of Dorset, England
Trendlebere Down, woodland managed by Natural England in Dartmoor, Devon, England
Twyford Down, area of chalk downland southeast of Winchester, Hampshire, England
Tytherington Down, biological Site of Special Scientific Interest in Wiltshire, England
Upton Cow Down, biological Site of Special Scientific Interest in Wiltshire, England
War Down, one of the highest hills in the county of Hampshire, England
Waterpit Down in Forrabury and Minster, a civil parish in Cornwall, England
Watership Down, Hampshire, hill in Ecchinswell, Sydmonton and Bishops Green in Hampshire, England
Wavering Down, geological and biological Site of Special Scientific Interest in the Mendip Hills, Somerset, England
West Down, civil parish and village located in North Devon, England, between Braunton and Ilfracombe
Headon Warren and West High Down SSSI, Site of special scientific interest, Isle of Wight
West Yatton Down, biological Site of Special Scientific Interest in Wiltshire, England
Westover Down, chalk down on the Isle of Wight
Wether Down, one of the highest hills in the county of Hampshire, England
Whiddon Down, hamlet within the parish of Drewsteignton in Devon
Whitehill Down, Site of Special Scientific Interest in Carmarthen & Dinefwr, Wales
Willingdon Down, Site of Special Scientific Interest in Eastbourne, East Sussex, England
Win Green Down, biological Site of Special Scientific Interest in Wiltshire, England
Windmill Down, rural location near the town of Hambledon in Hampshire, England
Wingletang Down (St Agnes), Site of Special Scientific Interest on the island of St Agnes in the Isles of Scilly, England
Winterbourne Down, Gloucestershire, village in South Gloucestershire, England
Worthy Down Camp, British Army barracks near Winchester, Hampshire, England
Yellowmead Down, location of Yellowmead stone circle near Sheepstor in Devon, England

Battles on downs
Battle of Hingston Down in 838 at Hingston Down, Cornwall between Cornish and Vikings against West Saxons
Battle of Roundway Down in 1643 during the First English Civil War
Battle of Sourton Down in 1643 during the First English Civil War
Battle of Stalling Down in 1403 between the supporters of the Welsh leader Owain Glyndŵr and those of King Henry IV of England

See also
Downland
Down (disambiguation)
Down (surname)
Downs (disambiguation)

Geography-related lists